Otto Beckmann (5 May 1908, in Vladivostok, Russia – 13 February 1997, in Vienna, Austria) was an Austrian sculptor and pioneer of media and computer art.

Life 

The family was forced to flee to Austria in 1922 where Otto Beckmann graduated from the HTL (Federal Secondary College of Engineering) in Mödling near Vienna and the Academy of Fine Arts in Vienna. In 1941, he became professor at the Institute for Arts and Crafts in Kraków.
 
Since 1945, he lived as an independent artist in Vienna and was a member of the Austrian Professional Association of Fine Arts. In 1951, he became a member of the Vienna Secession. In 1958, he was bestowed the professor title by the Austrian Federal Chancellor.

Otto Beckmann had 25 personal exhibitions and participated in more than 75 exhibitions in Austria and abroad.

Work 
The comprehensive and manifold art work by Otto Beckmann took place in the broad field between mystics and algorithms. It comprises paintings and sculptures as well as new forms of expression like abstract films and imaginary architecture (1966).

In 1966, he founded ars intermedia in cooperation with scientists of the Technical University Vienna. Among the members were Alfred Grassl, Oskar Beckmann and Gerd Koepf. The group was active until 1980.
Otto Beckmann participated in the international symposium on computer art in Zagreb and is regarded as “one of the pioneers of media and computer art” (Peter Weibel).

Otto Beckmann's works are in the Albertina, Vienna; the Austrian Federal Ministry of Education; the State Museum of Lower Austria, MUSA Vienna; Neue Gallerie Graz; Kunsthalle Bremen, Germany, ZKM Karlsruhe, Germany; as well as numerous private collections. Beckmann created a great number of mosaics on Vienna residential buildings as well as windows and doors in sacred buildings by Robert Kramreiter.

In 2005 the Archiv Otto Beckmann was founded by his son Richard.

References 

 Peter Weibel, Peter Peer (Eds.): Otto Beckmann – Zwischen Mystik und Kalkül (Between mystics and calculus). Verlag der Buchhandlung Walther König, Köln 2008, .
 Horst Oberquelle, Oskar Beckmann: Beckmann's Studio Computers Specified for Early Computer Art. In: IEEE Annals of the History of Computing, USA, Vol. 30, No. 3, 2008, pp 20–31.
 Wulf Herzogenrath, Barbara Nierhoff-Wielk (Eds.): Ex Machina – Frühe Computergrafik bis 1979. (Ex Machina- Early computer graphics), Deutscher Kunstverlag 2007, .

External links 
 Literature by and on Otto Beckmann in the catalogue of the German National Library (Data record on the sculptor Otto Beckmann)
 Archiv Otto Beckmann – Index of exhibitions and publications by Beckmann

Austrian male sculptors
1908 births
1997 deaths
Artists from Vienna
Digital artists
Austrian digital artists
20th-century Austrian sculptors
Soviet emigrants to Austria
20th-century Austrian male artists